Waleed Saif (born in 1948) is a Palestinian-Jordanian poet, short storywriter, television drama writer, playwright, critic, researcher, and academic.

Origin, study and life
Walid Saif was born in Tulkarem city in the West Bank, Palestine, and received a BA in Arabic language and literature from the University of Jordan. He received his doctorate in linguistics from the School of Oriental and African Studies at the University of London in 1975. After that, he worked as a lecturer at the Department of Arabic at the University of Jordan for three years before leaving the department to work as a full-time writer for television drama. He has worked in the Syrian TV drama.
Dr. Waleed Saif is married to Dr. Iman Mahmoud Ibrahim and has three children, Khalid, Liana and Laila.

Career
Saif worked since 1987 as a director of educational production at Al-Quds Open University, which helped set up its preparatory programs. Besides academia, he employed his background by turning to nonfiction drama, compiling and screenwriting works about many major Arab and Muslim events and figures. His repertoire includes plays, series, and film. One of his books, The Long Path, was adapted in a TV series depicting the lives of successive generations of a Palestinian farming family during and after the Nakba. Saif authored Saladin, Omar ibn al-Khattab, and others.

Filmography

 Al-Taghriba Al-Filistinia (TV Series)
 Omar (TV series)
 Salah Al-deen Al-Ayyobi (TV series)
 "The Al-Andalus Quartet"
 Saqr Quraish (TV Series)
 Rabee Qurtuba (TV Series)
 Mulook ut-Tawaif (TV Series)
 Akhir Ayyam Gharnata (planned)

References

External links

Palestinian writers
University of Jordan alumni
Alumni of the University of London
Living people
1948 births
People from Tulkarm